Saint Irenaeus of Lugdunum (Lyons) was a Catholic bishop, theologian and early church father. 

Irenaeus or similar may also refer to:

 Irenaeus (Bekish) (1892–1981), primate of the Orthodox Church in America
 Irenaeus (Susemihl) (1919–1999), metropolitan bishop of Vienna and Austria of the Russian Orthodox Church and Soviet spy
 Irenaeus of Sirmium (died 304), bishop and martyr
 Irenäus Eibl-Eibesfeldt (1928–2018), Austrian ethnologist
 Patriarch Irenaios (Irenaios Skopelitis) (born 1939), patriarch of the Eastern Orthodox Patriarchate of Jerusalem

See also 
 Irinej, the Slavic form of Irenaeus
 Irineu (disambiguation), the Portuguese form of Irenaeus
 Irénée (disambiguation), the French form of Irenaeus
 Irene (disambiguation)